Niall Malcolm Stewart Macpherson, 1st Baron Drumalbyn   (3 August 1908 – 11 October 1987) was a Scottish Tory and National Liberal politician.

Background and education
The member of an important Liberal family from Inverness-shire, Macpherson was the eldest son of Sir Thomas Stewart Macpherson and Helen, daughter of Reverend Archibald Borland Cameron. He was the brother of George Macpherson and Sir Tommy Macpherson and a nephew of Lord Strathcarron. He was educated at Fettes College and Trinity College, Oxford. He initially worked in business, representing a firm in Turkey. He joined the Cameron Highlanders from 1939, serving in World War II including in Madagascar.

Political career
Macpherson was elected Member of Parliament for Dumfriesshire at the 1945 general election. He served as Liberal-Unionist Scottish whip from 1950 to 1955, when he was appointed Joint Under-Secretary of State for Scotland by Sir Anthony Eden, a post he retained when Harold Macmillan became Prime Minister in early 1957. In 1960 he was made Parliamentary Secretary to the Board of Trade. Two years later Macpherson was sworn of the Privy Council and appointed Minister of Pensions and National Insurance. In October 1963 he was made Joint-Minister of State for Trade by the new Prime Minister, Sir Alec Douglas-Home, and the following month he was raised to the peerage as Baron Drumalbyn, of Whitesands in the Royal Burgh of Dumfries. He continued at the Board of Trade until the Conservative government fell at the 1964 general election. He was once again a member of the government as Minister without Portfolio under Edward Heath from 1970 to 1974.

In 1954, his membership of the London agency of the Dried Fruits Control Board of the Commonwealth of Australia gave rise to concern that he might be disqualified from sitting or voting as a member of the House of Commons by virtue of the Succession to the Crown Act 1707. To avoid this problem, an Act of Indemnity (the Niall Macpherson Indemnity Act 1954) was passed.

Lord Drumalbyn was also chairman of the British Commonwealth Producers' Organization from 1952 and a member of the BBC General Advisory Council. In 1974 he was appointed a Knight Commander of the Order of the British Empire.

Family
Lord Drumalbyn married Margaret Phyllis, daughter of Julius Joseph Runge, in 1937. They had three daughters, Jean Stewart Macpherson, who married James Weatherall, Mary Stewart Macpherson, who married Philip Dudley Wilson and Howard Alvine Rees; and (Helen) Norah Macpherson (1947–1969), who died unmarried. Lady Drumalbyn died on 13 August 1979. In 1985, Lord Drumalbyn married Rita, widow of Harry Edmiston. Lord Drumalbyn died on 11 October 1987, aged 79. The title became extinct on his death as he had no sons.  His widow died on 12 March 2014.

References

External links 

1908 births
1987 deaths
People educated at Fettes College
Alumni of Trinity College, Oxford
Members of the Parliament of the United Kingdom for Scottish constituencies
Queen's Own Cameron Highlanders officers
British Army personnel of World War II
Conservative Party (UK) hereditary peers
Macpherson, Niall
Parliamentary Secretaries to the Board of Trade
Members of the Privy Council of the United Kingdom
Macpherson, Niall
Macpherson, Niall
Macpherson, Niall
Macpherson, Niall
Macpherson, Niall
UK MPs who were granted peerages
Knights Commander of the Order of the British Empire
Ministers in the Eden government, 1955–1957
Ministers in the Macmillan and Douglas-Home governments, 1957–1964
Hereditary barons created by Elizabeth II